ITF may refer to:

 Indian Territorial Force, part of the Indian Army during British India
 Industry Technology Facilitator, oil industry organization
 Integrated test facility, for testing a production system with dummy data
 Interleaved 2 of 5, bar code format
 International Holocaust Remembrance Alliance, also known as Task Force for International Cooperation on Holocaust Education, Remembrance, and Research
 International Taekwon-Do Federation
 International Tennis Federation
 International Transport Forum, an intergovernmental organization within the OECD (Organisation for Economic Co-operation and Development)
 International Transport Workers' Federation, worldwide confederation of transport trade unions
 International Tree Foundation
 International Trombone Festival, music festival organised by the International Trombone Association
 Iraqi Turkmen Front